Sarah Minear is a former West Virginia state senator  from the 14th district which represents part or all of the following counties: Grant County, Mineral County, Preston County, Taylor County, and Tucker County. She did not seek re-election in 2006.

In 2010, Minear ran for the Republican nomination for the U.S. House in West Virginia's 1st district, but came in third in the primary with 22 percent.

See also

List of members of the 77th West Virginia Senate

References

Living people
Republican Party West Virginia state senators
Women state legislators in West Virginia
Year of birth missing (living people)
21st-century American women